Ofoase is a small town in the Ashanti Akim South Municipal, [Juaso, the capital] in the Ashant, Ghana.

Education
 Ofoase Senior High Technical School

The school is a second cycle institution.

References

External links
 Asante Aki South Municipal

Akyemansa District